Adelung is a surname. Notable people with the surname include:

Friedrich von Adelung (1768–1843), German-Russian linguist, historian and bibliographer
Johann Christoph Adelung (1732–1806), German grammarian and philologist

See also
Mount Adelung, the highest peak in the Pskem Range in extreme north-east Uzbekistan's Tashkent Province